Tom Delaney may refer to:
 Tom Delaney (racing driver) (1911–2006), British sportsman and industrialist
 Tom Delaney (songwriter) (1889–1963),  American blues and jazz songwriter, pianist and singer

See also
 Thomas Delaney, Danish footballer
 Thomas A. Delaney, American lawyer and politician